Lục Xuân Hưng (born 15 April 1995) is a Vietnamese footballer who plays as a centre-back for V.League 1 club Thanh Hóa.

Honours

Club 
Đông Á Thanh Hóa
Vietnamese National Cup:
 Third place : 2022

International 
Vietnam
 AFF Championship: 2018

References 

1995 births
Living people
Vietnamese footballers
Association football central defenders
Thanh Hóa FC players
V.League 1 players
People from Sơn La province